Cristur may refer to:

Cristuru Secuiesc, a town in Harghita County, Romania, also called Cristur-Odorhei
Cristur-Şieu, a village in Șieu-Odorhei Commune, Bistriţa-Năsăud County, Romania
Criţ, a village in Buneşti Commune, Braşov County, Romania, formerly called Cristuru Săsesc
Cristur, a village in Deva city, Hunedoara County, Romania
Cristur-Crişeni, a village in Crişeni Commune, Sălaj County, Romania
Crestur, a village in Petreu Commune, Bihor County, Romania
Recea-Cristur, a commune in Cluj County, Romania
Cristur (river), a river in Hunedoara County, Romania